Mount Tigalalu at the western side of Halmahera island, Indonesia, is a stratovolcano located at the western end of Kayoa Island. Part of the volcano is flanked by coral limestones.

See also 

 List of volcanoes in Indonesia

References 

Stratovolcanoes of Indonesia
Mountains of Indonesia
Volcanoes of Halmahera